One is a project by Israeli composer Yuval Ron, who teams together with Turkish virtuoso Omar Faruk Tekbilek, Yair Dalal, singer Azam Ali (of the group Vas) and many others. Together they are essentially a Middle-Eastern super group.

Track listing
 Ahava Yeshana (Old Love)
 Like A Rose
 Resistance
 Remembrance
 To The Source
 Ein Hudra Rababa
 Mirage
 Birds Of The Nile
 Sacrifice
 Lament
 One
 Nava
 Ala Delouana
 Twenty Years Ago
 Duna At Night
 Baburi
 Betrayal
 Inshallah
 Childhood On The Red Sea

2003 albums